Fornos de Algodres is a municipality and a town in Portugal. The population in 2011 was 4,989, in an area of 131.45 km2. The municipality is located in Guarda District, Centro Region, Serra da Estrela Subregion. The present Mayor is Manuel Fonseca, elected by the Social Democratic Party. The municipal holiday is September 29.

The seat of  the municipality, Fornos de Algodres, is a historic town and boasts panoramic views of the upper Mondego river Valley and a nineteenth-century market with nearby winding cobbled streets as well as the Serra da Estrela, the highest mountain range in mainland Portugal.
Cities nearby: Mangualde, Gouveia, Seia, Guarda, Viseu, Trancoso, Pinhel.
 
Gastronomy: Queijo da Serra (hard cheese); requeijões (soft cheese). Train station: Fornos de Algodres Linha da Beira Alta.

Parishes
Administratively, the municipality is divided into 12 civil parishes (freguesias):

 Algodres
 Casal Vasco
 Cortiçô e Vila Chã
 Figueiró da Granja
 Fornos de Algodres (Town/Vila)
 Infias
 Juncais, Vila Ruiva e Vila Soeiro do Chão
 Maceira
 Matança
 Muxagata
 Queiriz
 Sobral Pichorro e Fuinhas

Notable people 
 António Bernardo da Costa Cabral, 1st Marquis of Tomar (1803–1889) a Portuguese statesman.
 António Borges (1898–1959) equestrian, bronze medallist in the 1924 Summer Olympics.
 Daniel Candeias (born 1988) a footballer with over 380 club caps
 Luisinho (born 1990) a footballer with over 350 club caps

References

External links
Municipality official website
Photos from Fornos de Algodres

 
Municipalities of Guarda District